Microtendipes is a genus of European non-biting midges in the subfamily Chironominae of the bloodworm family Chironomidae.

Species
M. anticus (Walker, 1848)
M. brevitarsis Brundin, 1947
M. britteni (Edwards, 1929)
M. caducus Townes, 1945
M. caelum Townes, 1945
M. chloris (Meigen, 1818)
M. confinis (Meigen, 1830)
M. diffinis (Edwards, 1929)
M. nigellus Hirvenoja, 1963
M. nitidus (Meigen, 1818)
M. pedellus (De Geer, 1776)
M. rydalensis (Edwards, 1929)
M. tarsalis (Walker, 1856)

References

Chironomidae
Diptera of Europe